Points of View is a studio album by jazz bassist Dave Holland's Quintet featuring saxophonist Steve Wilson, vibraphonist Steve Nelson, trombonist Robin Eubanks and drummer Billy Kilson, recorded in 1997 and released in 1998 on ECM.

Reception
The Allmusic review by Richard S. Ginell awarded the album 4 stars, calling it "a marvelous example of thoughtful, dynamically shifting ECM chamber jazz".

Geoffrey Himes of The Washington Post wrote "In the ongoing tradition of Charles Mingus, two of the most creative bandleaders in jazz today are bassist-composers, Charlie Haden and Dave Holland. Bassists -- who solo at their own peril -- understand better than anyone that in jazz the ensemble interaction is more important than the individual showcases. And it's the subtle, democratic give-and-take -- where the drummer and bassist matter as much as the keyboardist and horn players -- that makes the Dave Holland Quintet's "Points of View" so enthralling." David Lynch of The Austin Chronicle added, "Opposed to the more common jazz quartet, a quintet's extra musician brings forth more moods, textures, and possibilities."

Track listing
All compositions by Dave Holland except as indicated
 "The Balance" - 9:24
 "Mister B." - 11:01
 "Bedouin Trail" - 8:55
 "Metamorphos" (Robin Eubanks) - 8:29
 "Ario" - 10:24
 "Herbaceous" - 9:47
 "The Benevolent One" (Steve Wilson) - 7:05
 "Serenade" (Steve Nelson) - 6:49
Recorded at Avatar Studios in New York City on September 25 & 26, 1997
Notes: Mr. B. - dedicated to Ray Brown, Herbaceous - dedicated to Herbie Hancock

Personnel
Dave Holland - double bass
Steve Wilson - soprano saxophone, alto saxophone
Robin Eubanks - trombone
Steve Nelson - vibraphone, marimba
Billy Kilson - drums

References

External links

Dave Holland albums
1998 albums
ECM Records albums